Matteo Priuli (30 March 1528 - 3 April 1595) was a Roman Catholic prelate who served as Bishop of Vicenza (1565–1579) and Bishop of Novigrad (1561–1565).

Biography
On 5 Sep 1561, Matteo Priuli was appointed during the papacy of Pope Pius IV as Bishop of Novigrad.

On 13 Apr 1565, he was appointed during the papacy of Pope Pius IV as Bishop of Vicenza.
He served as Bishop of Vicenza until his resignation in 1579.

References

External links and additional sources
 (for Chronology of Bishops) 
 (for Chronology of Bishops) 
 (for Chronology of Bishops) 
 (for Chronology of Bishops) 

16th-century Italian Roman Catholic bishops
Bishops appointed by Pope Pius IV
1528 births
1595 deaths